opti buk is a DVD by electronic music group 808 State which was released in 2002. Also included was a bonus album, State to State 2. The DVD has been deleted, and only archive copies may be available. The name of the DVD is derived from optical (opti) and book (buk).

Contents 
17 promo videos
15-minute documentary about the G:Mex Turborave gig in Manchester, 1991
Home movies made by 808 State, including studio footage

Video track listing 
 "Pacific 707"
 "Ancodia"
 "The Only Rhyme That Bites"
 "Tunes Splits The Atom"
 "Cubik"
 "Olympic"
 "In Yer Face"
 "Ooops ("live" version)"
 "Ooops (Iceland version)"
 "Lift"
 "Time Bomb"
 "One In Ten"
 "Plan 9"
 "10 x 10"
 "Bond"
 "Azura"
 "Lopez"

References 

808 State albums
2002 video albums
2002 compilation albums
ZTT Records compilation albums
Music video compilation albums
ZTT Records video albums